Schumacheria is a small genus of plants in family Dilleniaceae. It contains 4 species.

Species
 Schumacheria alnifolia, Hook.f. & Thoms.
 Schumacheria angustifolia Hook.f. & Thomson
 Schumacheria castanaefolia, Vahl
 Schumacheria raphanoides Spreng. ex D.Dietr.

References

The Plant List

Dilleniaceae
Eudicot genera
Taxonomy articles created by Polbot